Clifton is a small uninhabited locality located in the Peel region of Western Australia, between Mandurah and Bunbury. Adjoining the nearby suburb of Herron. It lies on a narrow strip between Lake Clifton and Yalgorup National Park to the east, and the Indian Ocean to the west.

History
The area, originally known as "Koolijerrenup" by the local Noongar people, was named in honour of Marshall Walter Clifton (1787–1861), Chief Commissioner of the Western Australian Company's settlement at Australind and later a member of the Legislative Council.

Transport
Clifton is not served by public transport.

References

Suburbs of Mandurah
Towns in Western Australia